George Fahoum (4 July 1909 – 14 November 1999) was an Egyptian sprinter. He competed in the men's 100 metres at the 1936 Summer Olympics.

References

1909 births
1999 deaths
Athletes (track and field) at the 1936 Summer Olympics
Egyptian male sprinters
Olympic athletes of Egypt